Fassaite is a variety of augite with a very low iron content, . It is named after the Fassa Valley, Italy. 

It is thought to be a contact mineral formed at high temperature on the interface between volcanic rocks and limestone. It is also reported in meteorites.

References 

 

Inosilicates
Monoclinic minerals
Minerals in space group 15